Jerry Reese (born July 11, 1964) is a former American professional football player who was a defensive lineman in the National Football League (NFL) and the World League of American Football (WLAF). He played for the Pittsburgh Steelers of the NFL, and the Barcelona Dragons of the WLAF. Reese played collegiately at the University of Kentucky.

References

1964 births
Living people
American football defensive ends
American football defensive tackles
Barcelona Dragons players
Kentucky Wildcats football players
Sportspeople from Hopkinsville, Kentucky
Pittsburgh Steelers players
Players of American football from Kentucky